Headin' South is a 1918 American silent romantic comedy film directed by Arthur Rosson with supervision from Allan Dwan and starring Douglas Fairbanks. The film is now considered to be lost.

Plot
As described in a film magazine, a forest ranger known only as Headin' South (Fairbanks) goes forth in search of Spanish Joe (Campeau), a Mexican responsible for most of the treachery and outlawry along the U.S.-Mexican border. Headin' South gains quite a reputation as he goes along and finally believes himself worthy of joining Joe's band. in a whirlwind finish in which Joe is captured, Headin' South meets one of Joe's near victims (MacDonald) and falls in love with her.

Cast
 Douglas Fairbanks as Headin' South
 Frank Campeau as Spanish Joe
 Katherine MacDonald as The Girl
 James Mason as His Aide 
 Johnny Judd
 Tom Grimes
 Art Acord
 Hoot Gibson
 Edward Burns (credited as Ed Burns)
 Jack Holt
 Marjorie Daw

Reception
Like many American films of the time, Headin' South was subject to cuts by city and state film censorship boards. For example, the Chicago Board of Censors, in Reel 1, cut two scenes of shooting and men falling, shooting homesteader and his falling at wagon, ten scenes of shooting at town, man at stairway being shot and falling dead, Reel 2, view of coin, Reel 4, the four intertitles "I've a scheme to get them away from the women, that leaves the choice to us", "There are fifteen women and a hundred men—how can we divide them?", "Let's have a race around the cactus, the first fifteen back will have the pick", and "We'll have the first pick while their gone", two scenes of Mexicans shooting up town, Reel 5, fifteen shooting scenes in which men fall, two intertitles "Where are the women" and "In the church", and all scenes of dead men and horses.

See also
 Hoot Gibson filmography
The House That Shadows Built (1931) promotional film by Paramount with excerpt of Headin' South
 List of lost films

References

External links

Headin' South at Cine silente mexicano 

1918 films
1918 romantic comedy films
1918 lost films
American romantic comedy films
American silent feature films
American black-and-white films
Films shot in Arizona
Films shot in Tucson, Arizona
Films directed by Allan Dwan
Films directed by Arthur Rosson
Lost American films
Paramount Pictures films
Lost romantic comedy films
1910s American films
Silent romantic comedy films
Silent American comedy films